Fritz Kalkbrenner (born 1981) is a German DJ and music producer.

He is a grandson of the East German artist Fritz Eisel and younger brother of Paul Kalkbrenner.

Discography

Albums 
 Here Today Gone Tomorrow (Suol, 2010)
 Suol Mates (Suol, 2012)
 Sick Travellin''' (Suol, 2012)
 Ways Over Water (Suol, 2014)
 Grand Départ (Suol, 2016)
 Drown (Suol, 2018)
 True Colours (Nasua, 2020)

 Singles and EPs 
 DJ Zky / Fritz Kalkbrenner – Stormy Weather (Cabinet Records, 2004)
 Paul & Fritz Kalkbrenner – Sky and Sand (BPitch Control, 2009)
 Chopstick & Johnjon feat. Fritz Kalkbrenner – A New Day (Baalsaal Music, 2009)
 Wingman EP (Baalsaal Music, 2009)
 The Dead End EP (Suol, 2010)
 Chopstick & Johnjon feat. Fritz Kalkbrenner – Keep On Keepin' On (Suol, 2010)
 Facing the Sun (Suol, 2010)
 Kings in Exile (Suol, 2010)
 Right in the Dark (Suol, 2011)
 Wes EP (Suol, 2011)
 Get a Life (Suol, 2012)
 Little by Little (Suol, 2012)
 Back Home (Suol, 2014)
 Void (Suol, 2015)
 One of These Days (Suol, 2015)
 In This Game (Suol, 2016)

 Films 
 Berlin Calling'' (2008)

References

External links 

 Fritz Kalkbrenner at MySpace
 Fritz Kalkbrenner at Best4Ears
 Fritz Kalkbrenner at Discogs
 

German electronic musicians
German DJs
1981 births
Living people
Electronic dance music DJs